Agama boensis is a species of lizard in the family Agamidae. It is a small lizard found in Guinea-Bissau, Guinea, Mali, and Senegal.

References

Agama (genus)
Reptiles described in 1940
Taxa named by Albert Monard